The 2009 World Rally Championship was the 37th season of the FIA World Rally Championship. The season consisted of twelve rallies and began on 30 January, with Rally Ireland and ended with Rally GB on 25 October. Sébastien Loeb won the World Drivers' championship at Rally GB by one point from Mikko Hirvonen, taking his sixth consecutive crown. Citroën secured their fifth Manufacturers' title, Martin Prokop won the JWRC Drivers' championship and Armindo Araujo won the PWRC Drivers' championship.

Regulation changes 

The number of mechanics available per car has been dropped from 12 to 8.

Calendar

The 2009 championship was contested over twelve rounds in Europe, South America and Oceania.

The 2009 season included twelve rallies, which was three fewer than the 2008 season, because the FIA imposed a "Round Rotation" System in order to attract candidate rallies to have a chance to be a WRC event. Monte Carlo, Sweden, Mexico, Jordan, Turkey, Germany, New Zealand, France and Japan were dropped from the calendar for 2009, but will return at the 2010 WRC Season. Ireland, Norway, Cyprus, Portugal, Poland and Australia returned to the 2009 season.

The eight events also part of the Production World Rally Championship were Norway, Cyprus, Portugal, Argentina, Italy, Greece, Australia and Rally GB. The eight rallies also on the Junior World Rally Championship schedule were Ireland, Cyprus, Portugal, Argentina, Italy, Poland, Finland and Spain.

Teams and drivers
In 2009 two categories are eligible to compete for the Manufacturer's championship:

Manufacturer (M)
must take part in all the rallies of the Championship with two cars of the same make
must enter only cars corresponding to the latest homologated version of a World Rally Car in conformity with the 2009 Appendix J
must inform the FIA of the name of the first driver entered for the season at the time of registration for the Championship. No change of the first driver is authorised, except in a case of force majeure. The driver of the second car may be changed for each of the rallies in the Championship

Manufacturer Team (MT)
must take part in a minimum of 8 Championship rallies with one or two cars; those rallies must be nominated on registering for the Championship
cannot enter World Rally Cars homologated during the year 2009 and cannot use parts homologated after 2 January 2009
can only score points in the events it nominated on registering.

The registered Manufacturers are Citroën Total World Rally Team and BP Ford Abu Dhabi World Rally Team; the registered Manufacturer Teams are Stobart VK M-Sport Ford, Munchi's Ford and Citroën Junior Team.
 
Suzuki and Subaru pulled out of the WRC at the end of the 2008 championship, both citing the economic downturn then affecting the automotive industry for their withdrawal.

J-WRC Entries

P-WRC Entries

† – At each rally, the organiser may nominate two "guest drivers" from their country to score support category points.

Results and standings

Results and statistics

Notes:
  – Stages 7 (Murley) and 8 (Fardross) were cancelled.
  – Stages 3 (Evangelistria) and 16 (Loutraki 2) were cancelled.
  – Stages 6 (CTEK East 1) and 11 (CTEK East 2) were cancelled.

Drivers' championship

 Sébastien Loeb secured the drivers' championship title in Wales.

Manufacturers' championship

 Citroën secured the manufacturers' championship in Catalunya.

JWRC Drivers' championship

PWRC Drivers' championship

References

External links

 Official website of the World Rally Championship
 FIA World Rally Championship 2009 at ewrc-results.com

 
World Rally Championship seasons